Aage Jepsen Sparre ( 1460–1540) was a Danish priest who was archbishop of Lund from 1523 to 1532.

Sparre enrolled at the University of Greifswald in Mecklenburg-Vorpommern in 1483 and graduated in 1490.

See also
List of bishops of Lund

References

Roman Catholic archbishops of Lund
16th-century Roman Catholic archbishops in Denmark
University of Greifswald alumni
Year of birth uncertain
1540 deaths
15th-century Danish people